The Maternity Protection Act 1994 is an Act of the Oireachtas (Irish parliament). Under the act, a woman is protected in pregnancy in such areas as health and safety and parental leave requirements.

Leave Requirement

Entitlement to 18 weeks paid leave with the option to take a further 8 weeks unpaid leave
Entitlement to attend doctors appointments without loss of pay

The pregnancy must be confirmed with a medical certificate from a doctor. The woman can choose her own dates but it most cover 4 weeks prior and post the birth and four weeks written notice before returning to work must also be given. The woman is entitled to return to the same job.

See also 
Maternity Protection Convention, 2000

External links 

1994 in Irish law
Acts of the Oireachtas of the 1990s